Diena is a small town and commune in the Cercle of Bla in the Ségou Region of southern-central Mali. In 1998 the commune had a population of 6,831.

References

Communes of Ségou Region